Richard Keese (November 23, 1794 – February 7, 1883) was an American jurist and politician who served one term as a U.S. Representative from New York from 1827 to 1829.

Biography 
Born in Peru (now Au Sable) Town, Clinton County, New York, Keese attended the common schools and Keeseville Academy. He engaged in agricultural pursuits.

Congress 
Keese was elected as a Jacksonian to the Twentieth Congress (March 4, 1827 – March 3, 1829).

Later career and death 
He engaged in auctioneering.

He served as judge of the Clinton County court of common pleas in 1835 and 1836.

He died in Keeseville, New York, on February 7, 1883. He was interred in Evergreen Cemetery.

Sources

1794 births
1883 deaths
Jacksonian members of the United States House of Representatives from New York (state)
19th-century American politicians

Members of the United States House of Representatives from New York (state)